"Hokus Pokus" is a song written by Insane Clown Posse and Mike E. Clark for the duo's 1997 studio album, The Great Milenko. A music video was produced for the Jason Nevins "Headhunta'z Remix" of the song in 1997. The single peaked at number 53 on the UK Singles Chart the following year. The song's chorus uses the "Streets of Cairo" melody.

Music video
A music video for "Hokus Pokus (Nevins Headhunta'z Mix)" was produced in 1997 after the release of The Great Milenko. The entire video was filmed during the day, as to avoid overtime costs. It features a comical portrayal of Insane Clown Posse destroying a shoe store before being pursued by security guards. The video also included appearances by hip hop artists Twiztid and Myzery.

Release
"Hokus Pokus" was released in 1998 as the second single from Insane Clown Posse's studio album The Great Milenko. The release was exclusive to Europe as a part of Island Records' attempt to promote the group internationally. The single was released in three different versions, with each featuring a remix of the song by Jason Nevins entitled "Hokus Pokus (Headhunta'z Remix)". The single peaked at number 54 on the UK Singles Chart that year. A vinyl version of the single was also released in Europe later that year.

Nevins' "Headhunta'z Remix" was later featured on Insane Clown Posse's rarities album Forgotten Freshness Volumes 1 & 2.

Commercial performance
On September 6, 2022, the song certified Gold by the RIAA, signifying sales of 500,000 equivalent units.

Track listing

Charts

Charts

Certifications

References

External links

Insane Clown Posse songs
Horrorcore songs
1997 songs